Toxoproctis croceola is a moth of the subfamily Lymantriinae first described by Embrik Strand in 1918. It is found in Taiwan and China.

The wingspan is 26–42 mm. Adults are on wing from April to September.

References

Wang, Houshuai; Wang, Min & Fan, Xiaoling (2011). "Notes on the tribe Nygmiini (Lepidoptera: Erebidae: Lymantriinae) from Nanling National Nature Reserve, with description of a new species". Zootaxa. 2887: 57–68.

Moths described in 1918
Lymantriinae